Emily Dawson is a teacher in the field of Science and Technology Studies. She is currently an Associate Professor at UCL in the Department of Science & Technology Studies.

Career 
Dawson's research focuses on how people encounter and engage with science, with an emphasis on equity and social justice.

She previously taught at King's College London, at the Royal College of Art and the University of the West of England.

Publications 
 Equity, Exclusion and Everyday Science Learning: The Experiences of Minoritised Groups (2020)

Awards 
Dawson honoured with Philip Leverhulme Prize in 2020 from the Leverhulme Trust. Dawson received the prize for her work on sociology of science and education, focusing on how structural inequalities affect science experiences outside school, in everyday, popular culture settings.

References

External links 
 Dawson's record on the UCL website
Dawson's personal homepage

Living people
Year of birth missing (living people)
Academics of University College London
British social scientists